Abū Muḥammad al-Qāsim ibn Muḥammad ibn Bashār al-Anbārī (d. 916/917) was an influential Arab philologist of the Abbasid era.

Biography 
Abu Muhammad year of birth is unknown. He lived most of his life in Baghdad, which at the time was under the rule of the Abbasid Caliphate and was the father of Abu Bakr al-Anbari (d. 940) who also was a famous philologist and grammarian. The majority of Abu Muhammad's lexicographical works are lost. His only surviving work is a commentary written by him on the highly regarded anthology of Arabic poetry known as Mufaḍḍaliyyāt, and it was revised by his son Abu Bakr.

References

See also 

 List of pre-modern Arab scientists and scholars

9th-century Arabs
9th-century people from the Abbasid Caliphate
916 deaths